The Phulkian Dynasty (or Phoolkian) of Maharajas or sardars were Jat-Sikh rulers and aristocrats in the Punjab region of India. They governed the states of Faridkot, Jind, Nabha, Malaudh and Patiala, allying themselves with the British Raj as per the Cis-Sutlej treaty. The Phulkain sardars are the descendants of Rawal Jaisal of Jaisalmer, who migrated to present day Malwa region of Punjab. The Phulkian dynasty claimed descent from Rawal Jaisal, the Bhati Rajput founder of Jaisalmer.

Lineage 

The rulers of the Phulkian states shared a common ancestor, the 17th-century Chaudhary Phul Singh Sidhu-Brar (1627–1689). Chaudhary Phul was born in 1629, to Chaudhary Rup Chand and Mat Ambi. He lived through the times of Guru Hargobind Ji, the sixth guru of the Sikh religion as well as Guru Har Rai Ji , the seventh Guru. The legends of Phul say that Chaudhary Phul Singh was given blessings from both Guru Hargobind Ji and Guru Har Rai Ji. Guru Hargobind Ji declared that Phul would have many "blossoms" like a flower (Phul or "phool" is a Punjabi word for flower). Phul's descendants went on to pursue this blessing by ruling the states of Nabha, Jind, Faridkot, Kaithal and Patiala.

The Maharajas of all three Phulkian states had supported the pre-Raj East India Company during the Indian Rebellion of 1857, both with military forces and supplies, as well as by offering protection for European people in affected areas. Despite this, in 1858 the British Raj authorities rejected a petition to allow them to adopt heirs to ensure lines of succession. They believed that such processes could be dealt with on an ad hoc basis if and when the situation arose, and that to accept the petition would be contrary to the Doctrine of Lapse. The matter was eventually taken up by the government in Britain, who demanded that the Raj authorities should grant the petition in recognition of the considerable loyalty that had been demonstrated during the rebellion. Thus, on 19 January 1860 at a durbar in Ambala, Charles Canning, the Governor-General of India, acceded to the request.

Inter-state dispute 
A dispute in the early 1920s between Bhupinder Singh, who had become Maharaja of Patiala in 1909, and his fellow Maharaja in Nabha, Ripudaman Singh, who became ruler in 1911, had significant ramifications both for relationships within the Sikh community and for British policy in the Punjab. According to historian Barbara Ramusack, the pair were "ambitious, arrogant, energetic, and jealous" and "shared the hypersensitivity on matters of izzat or honor and status common to most Indian princes". What began mostly as a war of words from around 1912 had become physical by the 1920s, with Bhupinder Singh complaining that the law courts of Ripudaman Singh had been falsely convicting Patiala police officers, as well as kidnapping girls from Patiala for the royal harem. On top of this were frequent boundary disputes, which had been a feature of strife between the states for many years because of the way in which the territories intertwined.

There were numerous attempts, with varying degrees of formality, to resolve the dispute. These included high-level court meetings, independent mediators and Sikh community groups such as the Shiromani Gurdwara Parbandhak Committee (SGPC). The situation was eventually referred to the British authorities in 1923, who instituted a quasi-judicial inquiry the conclusions of which generally supported the grievances raised by Bhupinder Singh and were critical of how Ripudaman Singh was administering his state and attempting to undermine the position of Patiala. Ripudaman, who had gained support from some extremist Akalis, was told that the British would formally intervene unless he abdicated and that this would lead to him being officially deposed. The abdication on 8 July 1923, which was effectively forced upon him, saw the British take over the administration of Nabha and caused uproar in Punjab: people protested what they considered to be unwarranted political interference and lauded Ripudaman both as a Sikh leader and nationalist. Newspapers in the region, with the support of the SGPC, pointed to his past favouring of the views of nationalists such as Gopal Krishna Gokhale, noted that he had spurned some rituals at his coronation, and alleged he sympathised with the Akalis. They also erroneously claimed that Bhupinder Singh opposed the abdication, which he was quick to deny.

That Bhupinder Singh chose to side with the British and instigate a counterpropaganda campaign at their request drove a wedge between Punjabi Sikhs. Patiala was considered to be the most important of the Sikh states and his prime minister, Daya Kishan Kaul, attempted to mobilise its supporters among the SGPC as well as those citizens of Nabha who had been ill-treated by Ripudaman. He also attempted to feed the press with stories in support of both his state and the British.

See also 

 Phulkian Misl
 Patiala State
 Nabha State
 Jind State
 Faridkot State
 Malaudh
 Bhadaur
 Kaithal
 Cis-Sutlej states

References 

Sikh families